Sound Tribe Sector 9 (STS9) is an instrumental band whose sound is based heavily on instrumental rock and electronic music, funk, jazz, drum and bass, psychedelia, and hip hop, originating in Georgia, United States. Self-described as "post-rock dance music,"  the band mixes standard live rock instrumentation with electronics, favoring group rhythm over individual solos.

STS9 has released 11 albums, two remixed albums (Artifact: Perspectives and Peaceblaster: Make it Right Remixes), and multiple live DVDs (Live as Time Changes, Axe The Cables, and various live performances) on their own label, 1320 Records. STS9 has toured the US and internationally.

History

STS9 was formed in Snellville, Georgia (just outside Atlanta), in 1998.

The band has headlined stages at festivals such as Summer Camp, Wakarusa, Moogfest, Bonnaroo, Outside Lands Festival, Regeneration, Lollapalooza, Camp Bisco and Electric Forest Festival. The group has raised significant amounts of money towards activism efforts, including $150,000 to the Make it Right Foundation, paving the way to rebuild a house in the Lower 9th Ward of New Orleans.

In the band's last studio album The Universe Inside, which is the twelfth in their full discography, STS9 continues to grow by incorporating dance and disco styles into their music.
STS9's self-owned record label, 1320 Records, currently boasts over 300,000 unique downloads and over 1,000 releases by over 100 artists including Pretty Lights, Big Gigantic, ESKMO, and the Glitch Mob.

Social work
STS9 has partnered with a variety of non-profit organizations throughout their career. Over the last decade, they have partnered with Conscious Alliance to bring food drives to various concerts and festivals on their tour. In exchange for fan participation in these events, STS9 and Conscious Alliance thank patrons with limited edition artwork posters, often created by the same artists who accompany the band on stage.  In 2005, STS9 put on a benefit concert where they raised over $20,000 for Hurricane Katrina victims.

Beginning in the fall of 2006, as part of their Live as Time Changes tour, STS9 traveled across the country in a carbon neutral tour bus and powered their live concerts using renewable energy. The band hoped to offset 100%, or about 138,000 pounds, of their carbon dioxide emissions from their tour by donations of Renewable Energy Credits from their partnership with environment-friendly companies.

STS9's remix album, Peaceblaster : The New Orleans Make It Right Remixes, features 30 remixes of material from their 2008 album, Peaceblaster. All proceeds from this album went to the Make it Right Foundation, in an effort to build a home in New Orleans, which has since been completed and taken up by a family displaced by Hurricane Katrina. The home has many eco-friendly features, including solar panels, high efficiency HVAC system, wire-free lighting panels, tankless water heater, dual flush toilets, low emissivity windows and doors, a rainwater collection system, and water-absorbing native landscaping. For protection against future storms, the home has walls that can withstand 130 mph winds, Kevlar hurricane shields for the windows, and a roof hatch in case an escape is necessary.

Notable concert performances
STS9 has gained acclaim, as well as a distinctly loyal fan base over the past decade. Their 2005 album Artifact reached #12 on Billboards Top Electronic Albums.  They have moved from playing and opening in small clubs and bars to headlining major music venues and festivals.  In 2003, the band reached new heights by opening for The String Cheese Incident in their first amphitheater performance, at majestic Red Rocks Amphitheatre in Morrison, Colorado. A concert scheduled for the previous night at the Fox Theater in Boulder, Colorado sold out in less than fifteen minutes. The band has now sold out numerous headlining Red Rocks shows, along with many other venues across the country.

In the San Francisco Bay Area, the band has built a following with frequent performances at The Fillmore, Warfield Theatre, and the historic Regency Center.  They have performed at the Fillmore on ten occasions, including three two-night stands, a three-night stand for Halloween in 2004, and a four-night stand in early 2009.  They have performed at the Warfield Theatre on five occasions, including a two-night stand. The band performed at the Regency Center on five occasions, including two consecutive New Year's Eve shows in 2002 and 2003.  The band has also put on performances at the Independent, Great American Music Hall, Golden Gate Park, and the Stern Grove Festival.  The band also performed at the Boulder Theater in Boulder, Colorado, for a five-night stand in March 2007.

Santa Cruz, California has been home to various members of the band since moving to California. The band has performed at the Catalyst on nine occasions since 2002, including two two-night stands.  The band frequently played a club called Palookaville, until it closed in 2002.  In 2003, the band headlined the Santa Cruz Civic Center.

In their home state of Georgia, the band continues to ride their popularity.  On October 3, 2006, the band marked the ninth anniversary of their first ever show with a celebration at the historic Georgia Theatre in Athens.  The band has performed many multiple-night stands at the Georgia Theatre since 2002.  For many years they have performed at the Tabernacle in Atlanta on New Year's Eve as part of multiple-night stands.

The band has also built their own fan base in Chicago, Illinois, after performing multiple times at North Coast Festival and Lollapalooza with late night performances at the House of Blues Chicago. Also making frequent trips to the Aragon Ballroom and the Congress, STS9 has made Chicago a go-to city for performances.

The band chose Denver as the host for their three 2009 New Year's Eve concerts. December 29 marked the band's first acoustic show ever, called "Axe the Cables." The band performed two sets at the University of Denver's Gates Hall. The remaining two nights were standard "electric" shows played at the Wells Fargo Theater. STS9 returned to Denver for New Year's Eve 2010, playing three shows at the Fillmore Auditorium. The December 29, 2010 show opened and closed with a cover of the Grateful Dead's "Shakedown Street".

For New Year's 2011, STS9 returned to the Tabernacle in Atlanta. They performed a five-night run starting on December 27. STS9 has continued to perform in Atlanta and Denver for New Year's since 2011.

In August 2012, STS9 played another "Axe the Cables" acoustic show at the Mountain Winery in Saratoga, CA.

In the summer of 2013, the band co-headlined a 14-city tour with Umphrey's McGee, alternating the closing slot each night.

In September 2014, STS9 returned to Red Rocks Amphitheatre in Colorado to play two nights to a sold-out crowd. This run included two Axe The Cables sets.

STS9 ended 2014 with a four-night stand at the Fillmore Auditorium in Denver. The band turned New Year's Day into a benefit for Conscious Alliance, inviting 600 fans to a sit-down dinner and a full improv set. This performance was later released through BitTorrent with the full 2014 catalog.

Returning to Red Rocks Amphitheatre in Colorado in September 2015, the group once again sold out both nights.

Festival appearances
STS9 has a steady presence in the music festival circuit, headlining several festivals across the country each season.

In 2007, the band announced they would return to Deerfields for a new festival titled Re:Generation.  The two-day festival included additional performances from the Join and Telefon Tel Aviv. According to the band's website, this event promised to be "a unique celebration of music, nature, family, mind, body, and spirit." In 2011, STS9 re-created the Re:Generation festival in its second incarnation held at Horning's Hideout in North Plains, Oregon, with a lineup that included  Glitch Mob, Beats Antique, and Tycho.

In May 2008, the band performed at the Summer Camp Music Festival in Chillicothe, Illinois.

On Saturday June 7, 2008, the band headlined the Sun Down Stage at the Wakarusa Music Festival at Clinton State Park, Lawrence, Kansas.

At Rothbury 2008, the band performed a three and a half hour show, which packed a capacity crowd.

In June 2011, the band performed at Bonnaroo in Manchester, Tennessee. Their show began at 2:30am and played until sunrise.

In 2012, the band performed at the Hangout Music Festival, Electric Forest, High Sierra Music Festival, and North Coast Festival.

From 2013, STS9 has performed at festivals including High Sierra Music Festival, Moonrise Festival, Suwannee Hulaween, Pemberton Music Festival, All Good Music Festival, Bonnaroo, Wakarusa, Summer Camp Music and Camping Festival, BUKU, The Voodoo Music + Arts Experience, Hangout Music Festival, Beale Street Music Festival, Counterpoint, Summer Set Music Festival and McDowell Mountain Festival.

In 2018, STS9 organized and headlined the first annual Wave Spell Festival in Belden Town, CA. During this festival they played 9 sets of music, 3 of which were entirely improvised. A variety of musical performers joined STS9 at Wave Spell, including: Sunsquabi, eDIT and Ooah of the Glitch Mob, Manic Focus, Michael Menert, Charlesthefirst, Antennae, Yak Attack and others. In addition to these guests, David Phipps and Zach Velmer of STS9 performed solo sets. The band has announced the second year of Wave Spell, which will occur in August 2019.

Sound Tribe Sector 9 has performed live at the following events:
10,000 Lakes Festival (Detroit Lakes, Minnesota) – 2005
Adirondak Mountain Music Fest. (Moose River Campground, Lyonsdale, New York) – 2003
All Good Music Festival (Masontown, West Virginia / Legend Valley, Ohio) – 2007, 2009, 2011, 2013, 2015
Anon Salon's Sea of Dreams (San Francisco, California) – 2002, 2003
Area 51 Soundtest (Indian Springs, Nevada) – 2004
Austin City Limits (Austin, Texas) – 2002, 2007, 2009
Backwoods at Mulberry Mountain (Ozark, Arkansas) – 2018
Berkfest (Great Barrington, Massachusetts) – 2001–2003
Big Wu Family Reunion (Black River Falls, Wisconsin) – 2001
Bonnaroo Music Festival Late Nite Show (Manchester, Tennessee) – 2003, 2005, 2007, 2011, 2015, 2018
Buku Music Festival (New Orleans, Louisiana) – 2013, 2015
Camp Bisco (various locations) – 1999, 2007, 2009, 2013, 2015, 2016, 2018, 2019
Coachella Valley Music and Arts Festival (Indio, California) – 2002
CounterPoint Music Festival (Kingston Downs, Georgia) – 2014
Creekside Jamboree (Almost Heaven Campground, Forksville, Pennsylvania) – 2003
Dancin' in the District (Riverfront Park, Nashville, Tennessee) – 2005
Earthdance Festival (Ya-Ka-Ama Native American Reservation, Santa Rosa, California) – 2001
Earthdance Festival (Golden Gate Park, San Francisco, California) – 2002
Earthdance Festival (Black Oak Ranch, Laytonville, California) – 2003, 2005, 2009
Electric Forest Festival (Double JJ Ranch, Rothbury, Michigan) – 2012, 2014, 2016 (2 sets including Axe The Cables)
Euphoria Music Festival (Carson Creek Ranch, Austin, Texas) – 2015, 2016
Fairfax World Music Festival (Fairfax, California) – 2002
Family Affair Festival (Port Orford, Oregon) – 2001
Fourth of July Festival (Nelsons Ledges, Garrettsville, Ohio) – 2005
Fuji Rock Festival (Japan)
Gathering of the Vibes (Seaside Park, Bridgeport, Connecticut) – 2000, 2012
Harmonic Convergence Fest – STS9 Presents (Deerfields Amphitheater, Horse Shoe, North Carolina) – 2002, 2003
Harmony Fest (Sonoma County Fairgrounds, Santa Rosa, California) – 2006, 2007
High Sierra Music Festival  (Plumas County Fairgrounds, Quincy, California) – 1999–2004
Horning's Hideout SCI Festival (North Plains, Oregon) – 2004
Hangout Music Festival (Gulf Shores, Alabama) – 2011, 2012, 2014
The Hudson Music Project (Saugerties, New York) – 2014
Jam In The Dam (Melkweg, Amsterdam, the Netherlands) – 2006
Jam On The River (Philadelphia, Pennsylvania) – 2007
Jamcruise – 2005, 2010
Kanrocksas – 2011
Langerado (Sunrise, Florida) – 2004, 2007, 2008
Live OFF The Levee (Soldier Memorial Plaza, St. Louis, Missouri) – 2008
Lollapalooza (Grant Park, Chicago, Illinois) – 2005, 2007, 2009
Lunatic Picnic Outdoor Festival (Hakonomori Play Park, Shiobara Onsen, Tochigi Prefecture, Japan) – 2002
Memphis in May Festival/Beale Street Music Festival (Memphis, Tennessee) – 2004, 2014
Music Midtown Festival (Atlanta, Georgia) – 2003
Moonrise Festival (Baltimore, Maryland) – 2014, 2016
Mountain Music Festival (Willow Creek, California) – 2003
Musicians For Medical Marijuana (Oakland, California) – 2001
Nateva Music & Camping Festival (Oxford, Maine) – 2010
New Orleans Jazz & Heritage Festival Late Nite Show (New Orleans, Louisiana) – 2001, 2004, 2007
Nocturnal Music Festival Texas (Apache Pass, Texas) – 2012
North Coast Music Festival (Chicago, Illinois) – 2011, 2012, 2014
Oregon Eclipse Music Festival (Big Summit Prairie, Oregon) – 2017
Oulipo Ballroom (Lexington, Kentucky) – 2009
Outside Lands Music and Arts Festival (San Francisco, California) – 2011
PhilFest (Patten Gymnasium, Northwestern University, Evanston, Illinois) – 2002
Red Rocks the Vote (Red Rocks Amphitheatre, Morrison, Colorado) – 2004
Re:Generation – STS9 Presents (Deerfields Amphitheater, Horse Shoe, North Carolina) – 2007
Re:Generation – STS9 (hornings hideout, North Plains, Oregon) – 2011
Rothbury Music Festival (Rothbury, Michigan) – 2008, 2009
Snowball Music Festival (Winter Park, Colorado) – 2013
Sonic Bloom – 2007, 2015
Sno-Core Icicle Ball – 2002
Stern Grove Festival (SG Park, San Francisco, California) – 2003
Street Scene (San Diego, California) – 2008
Summercamp Festival (Chillicothe, Illinois) – 2008, 2010, 2011, 2013, 2015, 2016, 2018, 2021, 2022
SummerFest (Milwaukee, Wisconsin) – 2009, 2010
Summer Set Music Festival (Somerset, Wisconsin) – 2013, 2016
Suwannee Hulaween (Live Oak, Florida) – 2013, 2015, 2018
Tamarack Music Festival (Bear Valley, California) – 2001
Van Hoy Farms Family Campground (Union Grove, North Carolina) – 2001
Vegoose Music Festival (Las Vegas, Nevada) – 2007
Vegoose Late Night Show (Las Vegas, Nevada) – 2005, 2006,2007
The Verizon Amphitheater (Alpharetta, Georgia) – 2016
The Voodoo Music + Arts Experience (New Orleans, Louisiana) – 2016
Wakarusa Music and Camping Festival (Clinton State Park, Lawrence, Kansas) – 2004, 2006, 2008 (Mulberry Mountain, Ozark, Arkansas) – 2009, 2010, 2011, 2013, 2014, 2015
The Werk Out Music and Arts Festival (Legend Valley, Thornville, Ohio) – 2016
Resonance Music and Arts Festival (Legend Valley, Thornville, Ohio) – 2017, 2018

Discography

1998: Interplanetary Escape Vehicle – Landslide Records
 Moon Socket (10:05)
 Hubble (7:10)  
 Wika Chikana (12:56)
 H. B. Walks to School (6:00)
 Four Year Puma (6:39)
 Tap-In (2:45)
 Quests (5:36)
 Evasive Maneuvers (5:50) 
1999: Sector 9 – The Brown Album (Live Release) – Landslide Records
 Tap-In
 T. W. E. L. V. E.
 Kamuy
 Frequencies Peace 1
 Frequencies Peace 2
 Frequencies Peace 3
 Surreality
 Lub Duh Earf
2000: Offered Schematics Suggesting Peace – Landslide Records
 Foreword (0:22)
 Squares and Cubes (6:10)
 Otherwise Formless (6:13)  
 Kamuy (5:34)  
 Water Song (3:40)  
 Common Objects Strangely Placed (2:19)  
 ...And Some Are Angels (6:16) 
 Turtle (3:16)  
 Mischief of a Sleepwalker (5:37)  
 Inspire Strikes Back (8:05)  
 EB (10:33)
2002: Seasons 01 (Live Release, Double CD) – 1320 Records
 A Gift for Gaia (12:13)
 Jebez (15:28)
 Ramone & Emiglio (19:18)
 Satori (10:51)
 Good for Everyday (8:34)
 Equinox (8:41)
 Kaya (12:17)
 Eclipse (5:13)
 Thread (15:40)
 Breach (2:57)
2003: Live at Home – 1320 Records
 Intro (0:48)
 Kotamo (2:47)
 Manatee (5:33)
 L1nQs (2:02)
 Since 7th (1:48)
 Luma Sunrise (5:30)
 Believe (2:07)
 Haiku (2:14)
 Oceans Ride (3:40)
 N'terlude (0:23)
 Havona Ascent (2:09)
 Midwest (6:11)
 Midwest Sky (1:31)
 Egil (5:57)
 Like That ? (1:14)
 Purity Too (3:50)
 Linguistics (4:41)
 Care Too (2:44)
 Power Is The People (2:29)
 Tact (4:00)
 Summit (7:08)
 Drone Slowly (a Walk Through Philly) (3:35)
 Slight Shift (Firetrucks Outro) (1:19)
2005: Artifact – 1320 Records -- <small>#12 on Billboard'''s Top Electronic Albums chart</small>
 musical story, yes (0:28)
 Better Day (4:49)
 By the Morning Sun (3:35)
 Tokyo (7:03)
 ARTiFACT (2:12)
 Native End (4:31)
 ReEmergence (5:01)
 Peoples (4:19)
 GLOgli (5:20)
 Today (4:21)
 Tonight the Ocean Swallowed the Moon (2:51)
 Forest Hu (0:50)
 Somesing (6:49)
 Trinocular (4:44)
 Vibyl (3:00)
 8 &  Extra (1:28)
 Possibilities (3:45)
 Peoples part II (4:02)
 first mist over Clear Lake (0:56)
 Music, Us (3:11)
 Bonus track: Tokyo (radio edit) (4:04)
2005: Artifact: Remixes Vol.1 (iTunes exclusive, 4-tracks) – 1320 Records
2005: Artifact: Perspectives (Remix album) – 1320 Records
 Better Day Remix (Sub-id) (4:05)
 Tokyo Remix (Machinedrum) (5:01)
 Possibilities Remix (Collective Efforts) (3:47)
 Tokyo/Better Day Remix (Ming+FS) (5:07)
 By the Morning Sun Remix (Slicker) (5:31)
 Somesing (Eustachian 24hr. White Knuckle Mix) (3:45)
 Possibilities Remix (Eliot Lipp & Leo 123) (4:17)
 Better Day/Trinocular STSDevine Remix (Richard Devine) (6:03)
 By the Morning Sun Remix (Metrognome) (5:04)
 Possibilities Remix (Mr. Lif) (3:38)
 Tokyo Shinjuku Flashback Mix (Bill Laswell) (9:12)
 Somesing Remix (Bassnectar) (2:38)
 ReEmergence, Beat the Science Remix (Karsh Kale) (6:43)
 Peoples, Cause & FX Remix (Lowpro Lounge: Audio Angel & ill45) (5:49)
 Better Day Remix (Genetic) (4:19)
2007: Here...Catch Essential Live Recordings (Live Compilation, distributed only in Japan)
2008: Peaceblaster – 1320 Records
2009: Peaceblaster: The New Orleans Make it Right Remixes – 1320 Records
2009: Ad Explorata – 1320 Records fall '09 Rohto V exclusive
2010: Axe The Cables – 1320 Records live acoustic set
2011: When The Dust Settles 1320 Records
2016: The Universe Inside – 1320 Records
2020: Visions Tapes - 1320 Records

Video and DVD
2003: STS9 Live in Santa Cruz – GrooveTV #201 (VideoCD, MPEG download); GrooveTV.net

DVD
 2006: Live As Time Changes (DVD) – 1320 Records; recorded Live December 29–31, 2005
 2009: Axe the Cables (on-demand streaming) – 
 2007–2010: STS9 Live (free streaming, on-demand streaming)

Members
 Hunter Brown - guitars, keyboards (1998-present)
 Zach Velmer - drums, electronic percussion, programming (1998-present)
 Jeffree Lerner - percussion, keyboards, programming (1998-present)
 David Phipps - keyboards, synthesizers, programming  (1998-present)
 David Murphy - bass guitar, keyboards, programming (1998-2012)
Alana Rocklin - bass guitar (2012-present)

References

 http://www.relix.com/articles/detail/back_to_the_future_an_oral_history_of_livetronica
 http://www.ew.com/article/2005/02/21/sixty-second-lesson-livetronica
 http://www.jambase.com/article/sts9-coming-full-circle
 http://digital.1320records.com/search/?artist=STS9
 http://www.jambase.com/article/sts9-returns-with-alana-rocklin-on-bass-new-material
 http://goodtimes.sc/uncategorized/it-takes-a-tribe-sts9/

External links
STS9.com - Official site

American instrumental musical groups
Livetronica music groups
Rock music groups from Georgia (U.S. state)
Electronic music groups from Georgia (U.S. state)
Musical groups established in 1998
Jam bands
Ableton Live users